Rushcliffe Halt is a railway station on the former Great Central Railway London Extension from London Marylebone serving the north of East Leake, Nottinghamshire, currently in use as part of the Nottingham Heritage Railway.

The stations was built as a later addition to the railway, opening in 1911 to serve the adjacent Rushcliffe Golf Club. Later, sidings were added to serve the nearby gypsum works. The station closed to passengers in 1963, although freight continued to serve British Gypsum until the early 1980s.

The station is the only surviving example of a Great Central Railway twin platform configuration; 'island' platforms were the standard on the route.

During the 1990s, the line and station entered preservation. In 2000 freight trains to the gypsum works resumed and in 2003 Great Central Railway (Nottingham) introduced a weekend passenger service between Loughborough junction and Nottingham Transport Heritage Centre Ruddington on a preserved section of the line. GCRN services terminate at a Stop Board close to the A60 road. Beyond that is the connection to Network Rail and the Midland Main Line (MML). There are plans for a high-level station to be built here. The loco shed of the Great Central Railway at Loughborough are just visible, across the MML at least just 1.1 mile across. There are also plans to reinstate a bridge across the MML and to join up with the GCR at Loughborough on the Leicester side.

Once both preserved sections are re-connected (with the bridging of the Loughborough Gap within full completion) this would extend to a total of over 18 miles in length.

References 

 

Former Great Central Railway stations
Heritage railway stations in Nottinghamshire
Railway stations in Great Britain opened in 1911
Railway stations in Great Britain closed in 1963
Great Central Railway (preserved)
East Leake